"Walk Away" is a song by Scottish rock band Franz Ferdinand and is featured on their second album, You Could Have It So Much Better. It was released 5 December 2005 as the second single from that album in the United Kingdom, entering the UK Singles Chart at number 13 a week later.

Track listings
All tracks were written by Franz Ferdinand, except where noted.

7-inch (RUG215)
"Walk Away" – 3:36
"The Fallen" (acoustic version) – 2:44

CD (RUG215CD)
 "Walk Away" – 3:36
 "Sexy Boy" (Air cover) (Jean-Benoît Dunckel, Nicolas Godin) – 3:40

DVD (RUG215DVD)
 "Walk Away" (video)
 "Walk Away" (making of video)
 "This Boy" (live in Edinburgh)

2011 digital reissue (DOMDIG009)
"Walk Away" – 3:36
"The Fallen" (acoustic version) – 2:44
"Sexy Boy" (Air cover) (Dunckel, Godin) – 3:40
"Walk Away" (acoustic version) – 3:38

Personnel
Artwork By [Design] – Matthew Cooper
Artwork By [Photography] – Mads Perch-Nielsen
Engineer – Carl Granville
Mixed By – Parker*
Producer – Franz Ferdinand, Rich Costey (tracks: 1)

Charts

References

External links
 

Songs about parting
2005 singles
2005 songs
Franz Ferdinand (band) songs
Song recordings produced by Rich Costey
Songs written by Alex Kapranos
Songs written by Nick McCarthy
Songs written by Paul Thomson